The Limitation Act 1980 (c. 58) is an Act of the Parliament of the United Kingdom applicable only to England and Wales. It is a statute of limitations which provides timescales within which action may be taken (by issuing a claim form) for breaches of the law. For example, it provides that breaches of an ordinary contract are actionable for six years after the event whereas breaches of a deed are actionable for twelve years after the event. In most cases, after the expiry of the time periods specified in the Act the remedies available for breaches are extinguished and no action may be taken in the courts in respect of those breaches.

Summary of time limits 
The ordinary time limits allowed by the act are set out below. These limits may, in some cases, be extended or altered. Most of the time limits run from the day after the accrual of action, which is "the earliest time at which an action could be brought". If the potential claimant was not at least 18 or did not have a sound mind at the time of the accrual of action, time will not run until he is at least 18 and has sound mind. Where there has been fraud or concealment, or the action is for relief from the consequences of a mistake, time will not run until the fraud, concealment or mistake is discovered or could with reasonable diligence be discovered.

Magistrates' court fine non-payment
In September 2016 Her Majesty's Courts and Tribunals Service (HMCTS) set up the "Historic Debt Project" to tackle long outstanding unpaid criminal fines and financial orders, from debtors who previously were difficult to trace, with the use of new intelligence and tracing tools. Outstanding debts of 10 years and longer are pursued by a dedicated team in the HMCTS National Compliance and Enforcement Service. Magistrates' Court fines, being a criminal matter, are not subject to the Limitations Act 1980 (neither can they be included in bankruptcy, an  Individual Voluntary Arrangement (IVA) or a Debt Relief Order DRO).

References

External links
 

United Kingdom Acts of Parliament 1980
Statutes of limitations